Tan Howe Liang,  (born 5 May 1933 in Shantou, Guangdong, China) is a Singaporean weightlifter who was the first Singaporean to win an Olympic Games medal. He did this in the 1960 Summer Olympics in Rome where he won the silver medal in the lightweight category. Tan also broke the oldest-standing world record in the lightweight category in the clean and jerk in 1958. He was the only Singaporean Olympic medalist until the 2008 Summer Olympics.

Early life
Tan was born on 5 May 1933, in Swatow, China, where he was the third of eight siblings. When he was four years old, he emigrated with his family to settle in Singapore, where he grew up in Chinatown. Tan's Teochew father died when Tan was 14. Tan left school after his first year at a secondary school.

Weightlifting career
Tan's weightlifting career started when he walked past the World Amusement Park and witnessed his first weightlifting competition and became interested in the sport. After one year of training on his own, Tan, then 20, won national junior and senior championship in the lightweight division in 1953.

Without any financial support, Tan worked as a clerk at Cathay Organisation also worked as a mechanic to pay for his training. Despite the hardships, Tan continued his training.

During the 1956 Summer Olympics, in an attempt to lifting 241.75 pounds in the press, Tan fainted after lifting up the bar. After he was revived without injuries, he was advised to retire by the team manager, but refused. He went on to lift 220.75 pounds for the snatch and 314 pounds for the clean and jerk to earn ninth place.

In 1958, Tan established a world record with a lift of 347 pounds in the jerk for the lightweight division at the 6th British Empire and Commonwealth Games (now known as the Commonwealth Games), in Cardiff. He also won a gold at the 3rd Asian Games in Tokyo that year. In 1959, Tan won a gold medal at the inaugural Southeast Asian Peninsular Games (now known as the Southeast Asian Games) in Bangkok.

On 8 September 1960, Tan made another attempt at the Olympics in Rome. In the lightweight category (60–67.5 kg) competition held at the Palazetto Dello Sports Hall, the gold medal was won by Russia's Viktor Bushuev by breaking the world record. Tan had to compete with Iraq's Abdul Wahid Aziz for the silver medal. Tan had one final lift, the clean and jerk, left when he felt pain in his legs. He was advised by the doctors to receive treatment at  the Athlete's Village but he had to withdraw from the competition and lose the silver medal. Tan refused to go for treatment and continued to compete. Tan lifted a total of 380 kg and won the silver medal.

Life after the Olympics
Tan tried to run a restaurant business but was unsuccessful. He worked as a taxicab driver for a short stint, before becoming a weight-lifting coach in 1974. After his retirement from competition, Tan was hired as a gym supervisor by the Singapore Sports Council at the Kallang Family ClubFit in November 1982.

Honours

Tan's Olympic medal made him the only Singaporean to have won a medal at all the major international games – the SEAP Games (predecessor of the SEA Games), the Asian Games, the Commonwealth Games and the Olympic Games for 48 years. He also became the first weightlifter in the world to be awarded the International Weightlifting Federation (national honour) Gold Award in 1984. In Singapore, Tan was the only athlete to be bestowed the Pingat Jasa Gemilang (Meritorious Service Medal) at the National Day awards.

On 26 June 1996, a commemorative medallion set by the Singapore Mint was launched to celebrate the 1996 Olympic Games at Atlanta. It features Tan on one side of the medallion, showing him getting ready to lift weights.  When the image is tilted to a certain angle, the picture would show him having lifted the weights. Izzy, the official mascot of the Atlanta Olympics, is featured as a three-dimensional image on the other side of the medallion.

In 1999, Tan was nominated for the "Spirit of the Century" award.  In the same year, he was also nominated for "Singapore's Greatest Athlete" award, but conceded the award to former badminton champion, Wong Peng Soon, who was a four-time winner in the All England Open Badminton Championships in the 1950s.  Tan was featured in Time's "Millennium" series on Singapore sporting greats in 1999.

In 2000, McDonald's sponsored Tan's trip to the 2000 Olympic Games in Sydney, where he joined the Singapore contingent and attended the weightlifting competition.  McDonald's also donated S$10,000 with the aim to help revive the sport of weightlifting in Singapore. McDonald's also featured a two-minute special television commercial, titled "We Can Do It", featuring Tan's silver medal-winning feat at the 1960 Rome Olympics.  The commercial re-enacts the different stages of Tan's life, from childhood to his triumph at the Olympics.

Tan was given the honour of being the flagbearer at the closing ceremony of the National Stadium on 30 June 2007.  The leotard and belt which Tan wore during his 10-hour competition in Rome were put on display in a glass case in the Singapore Sports Council's Sports Museum at the National Stadium.

At the 2008 Summer Olympics, Singapore's table tennis players Feng Tianwei, Li Jiawei and Wang Yuegu won the silver medal in the women's team category, ending Tan's 48-year status of being the sole Singaporean Olympic medalist. At the 2012 Summer Olympics, Feng's bronze medal in the women's singles table tennis event meant that Tan was no longer the only Singaporean with an individual Olympic medal.

Achievements

References

External links
 
 
 
 Tan Howe Liang at Singapore Infopedia
 
 

1933 births
Living people
Olympic silver medalists for Singapore
Olympic weightlifters of Singapore
Olympic weightlifters of Malaysia
Singaporean people of Teochew descent
People from Shantou
Chinese emigrants to Singapore
Weightlifters at the 1956 Summer Olympics
Weightlifters at the 1960 Summer Olympics
Weightlifters at the 1964 Summer Olympics
Commonwealth Games gold medallists for Singapore
Weightlifters at the 1958 British Empire and Commonwealth Games
Weightlifters at the 1962 British Empire and Commonwealth Games
World record setters in weightlifting
Olympic medalists in weightlifting
Asian Games medalists in weightlifting
Weightlifters at the 1958 Asian Games
Recipients of the Pingat Jasa Gemilang
Singaporean male weightlifters
Medalists at the 1960 Summer Olympics
Asian Games gold medalists for Singapore
Commonwealth Games medallists in weightlifting
Medalists at the 1958 Asian Games
Southeast Asian Games medalists in weightlifting
Southeast Asian Games gold medalists for Singapore
Medallists at the 1958 British Empire and Commonwealth Games
Medallists at the 1962 British Empire and Commonwealth Games